Noboru Aomi (born 5 December 1938) is a Japanese wrestler. He competed in the men's Greco-Roman middleweight at the 1960 Summer Olympics.

References

External links
 

1938 births
Living people
Japanese male sport wrestlers
Olympic wrestlers of Japan
Wrestlers at the 1960 Summer Olympics
Sportspeople from Niigata Prefecture
20th-century Japanese people